John Crawford Gillies (22 October 1918 – 4 November 1991), sometimes known as Jackie Gillies, was a Scottish professional football outside left who played in the Scottish League for Clyde. He toured Canada and the US with the Scottish FA representative team in September 1939 and also briefly played in England for Brentford.

Honours 
Clyde
 Scottish Cup: 1938–39

Career statistics

References

1918 births
Scottish footballers
English Football League players
Footballers from Glasgow
Association football outside forwards
1991 deaths
Scottish Football League players
Clyde F.C. players
Brentford F.C. players
Greenock Morton F.C. players
Heart of Midlothian F.C. wartime guest players
St Mirren F.C. wartime guest players
Third Lanark A.C. wartime guest players
Middlesbrough F.C. wartime guest players
Shawfield F.C. players
Scottish Junior Football Association players